Miss Latvia (Miss and Mr. Latvia, LLC) is a national beauty pageant in Latvia.

History
The pageant is organized by Agency Miss and Mr Latvia which is led by Swiss-Latvian model and World Miss University 2004 Jūlija Djadenko-Müggler and Miss Latvia 2005 Kristīne Djadenko. Until 2015 the agency Mis Latvija was the only official organization entitled to organize the national beauty contests Miss and Mister Latvia, which it did since 1990.

The owner and founder Mis Latvija was Inta Fogele (1957–2016), who had organized the Latvian beauty pageants since 1988, when the inaugural Miss Riga competition took place. In 2015, she agreed to transfer the right to the Miss Latvia brand over to Miss and Mr Latvia LLC. The government of Latvia partially supported the agency at some point by financing the licenses to Miss and Mister World contests as a way of promoting the image of the country in the world.

Titleholders

Big Four pageants

Representatives to Miss World
Color key

Representatives to Miss Earth

Representatives to Miss International

Representatives to Miss Global Beauty Queen

See also
Miss Universe Latvia

Notes

References

External links
Official website
Miss World Latvija

Latvia
Beauty pageants in Latvia
Recurring events established in 1989
Latvian awards